Come Share the Wine is an album by Jimmy Sturr and His Orchestra, released through Rounder Records on August 21, 2007. In 2008, the album won the group the Grammy Award for Best Polka Album.

Track listing 
 "Dancin' with Rosie" (Mecham, Seibert, Vigetta) – 2:27
 "Dominique" (Sœur Sourire) – 2:45
 "Not Supposed To" (Mecham, Seibert, Vigetta) – 2:58
 "Come Share the Wine" (Black, Jürgens, Kasha, Montana) – 3:34
 "Red Wing" (Chattaway, Mills) – 2:12
 "Small Town Memory Lane" (Wing) – 2:57
 "Snappy Time" (Soyka) – 2:38
 "I'm Gonna Steal Your Shoes" (Bryant, Bryant) – 2:00
 "Bride and Groom" (Karnish) – 2:42
 "Blind Date" (Henry) – 2:37
 "My Girl" – 2:38
 "Fiddles and Bows" (Driftwood) – 1:59
 "Come Share the Wine" (Black, Jürgens, Kasha, Montana) – 2:56

Personnel 

 Ray Barno Orchestra – Clarinet, Sax (Alto), Sax (Baritone)
 Don Black – Composer
 Jerry Calhoun – Vocals, Guest Appearance
 Mark Capps – Engineer
 Thurland Chattaway – Composer
 Dennis Coyman – Drums
 Nick Devito – Clarinet, Sax (Alto)
 Joe Donofrio – Producer, Mixing
 Allen Henson – Vocals (background)
 Ken Irwin – Producer, Mixing
 The Jordanaires – Vocals (background)
 Johnny Karas – Sax (Tenor), Vocals
 Al Kasha – Composer
 Dave Kowalski – Assistant Engineer
 Kevin Krauth – Trumpet
 Joe Magnuszewski – Clarinet, Sax (Alto)
 Dr. Toby Mountain – Mastering

 Louis Dean Nunley – Vocals (background)
 Eric Parks – Trumpet
 Rich Pavasaris – Bass
 Al Piatkowski – Accordion
 Tom Pick – Producer, Engineer, Mixing, Overdub Engineer
 Nancy Seibert – Composer
 Keith Slattery – Piano
 Soeur Sourire – Composer
 Keith G. Stras – Liner Notes
 Jimmy Sturr – Mixing
 Steve "Rocky" Swiader – Accordion
 Dana Sylvander – Trombone
 Frank Urbanovitch – Fiddle, Vocals
 Terry Waddell – Arranger
 Henry Will – Arranger
 Lance Wing – Composer
 Curtis Young – Vocals (background)

See also 
 Polka in the United States

References 

2007 albums
Grammy Award for Best Polka Album
Jimmy Sturr albums
Rounder Records albums